The 1999–2000 UNLV Runnin' Rebels basketball team represented the University of Nevada, Las Vegas. The team was coached by Bill Bayno and played their home games at the Thomas & Mack Center on UNLV's main campus in Paradise, Nevada as a member of the Mountain West Conference. The Runnin' Rebels finished the season 23–8, 10–4 in MWC play. They won the 2000 Mountain West Conference men's basketball tournament to receive an automatic bid to the 2000 NCAA Division I men's basketball tournament, earning a No. 10 seed in the South Region. The Runnin' Rebels lost to No. 7 seed Tulsa in the opening round.

Roster

Schedule and results 

|-
!colspan=9 style=| Non-conference regular season

|-
!colspan=9 style=| MWC regular season

|-
!colspan=9 style=| MWC tournament

|-
!colspan=9 style=| NCAA tournament

References 

UNLV Runnin' Rebels basketball seasons
UNLV
UNLV
UNLV Runnin' Rebels basketball team
UNLV Runnin' Rebels basketball team